Clayton da Silveira da Silva (born 23 October 1995), simply known as Clayton, is a Brazilian footballer who plays as a forward for Londrina.

Club career
Born in Rio de Janeiro, Clayton joined Figueirense's youth setup in 2007, aged 12. On 3 November 2012 he made his first team – and Série A – debut, coming on as a late substitute in a 0–1 away loss against Flamengo.

After appearing with the under-20s, Cleyton was definitely promoted to the main squad in 2014. On 3 August 2014 he scored his first professional goal, netting the second in a 3–0 home win against Sport Recife.

On 28 September Cleyton netted a brace in a 3–1 home success over Palmeiras. He finished the campaign with 22 appearances and five goals, as his side avoided relegation.

Clayton scored seven league goals during the 2015 season, including a brace against Flamengo, as his side again narrowly avoided the drop. He finished the year with 17 goals in 56 matches.

On 23 February 2016, Clayton moved to fellow league team Atlético Mineiro.

On 23 March 2017, Clayton was loaned to Corinthians until the end of the season, but returned to Atlético in August.

On 10 August 2018, Clayton joined Bahia on a year-long loan. He returned to Atlético in August 2019, before joining  Vasco da Gama on loan for the remainder of that year.

On 25 June 2020, Clayton mutually terminated his contract with Atlético.

International goals

U22

Honours
Figueirense
Campeonato Catarinense: 2014, 2015

References

External links

 

1995 births
Living people
Footballers from Rio de Janeiro (city)
Brazilian footballers
Brazilian expatriate footballers
Association football forwards
Campeonato Brasileiro Série A players
Figueirense FC players
Clube Atlético Mineiro players
Sport Club Corinthians Paulista players
Esporte Clube Bahia players
CR Vasco da Gama players
FC Dynamo Kyiv players
Centro Sportivo Alagoano players
Londrina Esporte Clube players
Footballers at the 2015 Pan American Games
Pan American Games bronze medalists for Brazil
Pan American Games medalists in football
Ukrainian Premier League players
Expatriate footballers in Ukraine
Brazilian expatriate sportspeople in Ukraine
Medalists at the 2015 Pan American Games